Bang Sin-hye (born 13 May 1967) is a South Korean hurdler. She competed in the women's 100 metres hurdles at the 1988 Summer Olympics.

Bang began participating in track as a student at the Gyeongsan Girls' Middle School. She went on to attend Gyeongsan Girls' High School and Kyungpook National University. Her personal best of 13.63 seconds in the women's 100m hurdles, which she set on 7 May 1988 at the 42nd National University Track Championships, stood as South Korea's national record for 16 years until it was broken by Lee Yeon-kyung on 24 September 2004. After the Olympics and her university graduation, she represented the city of Daegu in South Korean national competitions. She came in first place in the 110m hurdles with a time of 14.59 seconds at the 72nd National Track Championships in June 1990. She later retired from sport and became a teacher at Daegu No. 1 Science High School. She joined the board of directors of the Daegu Sports Council in 2016.

Notes

References

1967 births
Living people
Athletes (track and field) at the 1988 Summer Olympics
South Korean female hurdlers
Olympic athletes of South Korea
Place of birth missing (living people)
Kyungpook National University alumni